Alessio Occhipinti (born 26 March 1996) is an Italian open water swimmer.

He participated at the 2019 World Aquatics Championships, winning a medal.

References

1996 births
Living people
Italian male freestyle swimmers
World Aquatics Championships medalists in open water swimming
Italian male long-distance swimmers
Universiade medalists in swimming
21st-century Italian people
Universiade silver medalists for Italy
Medalists at the 2019 Summer Universiade